Lygodactylus laterimaculatus is a species of gecko endemic to Kenya and Tanzania. It is sometimes considered conspecific with Scheffler's dwarf gecko.

References

Lygodactylus
Reptiles described in 1964